Virtual Storage Access Method (VSAM) is an IBM DASD file storage access method, first used in the OS/VS1, OS/VS2 Release 1 (SVS) and Release 2 (MVS) operating systems, later used throughout the Multiple Virtual Storage (MVS) architecture and now in z/OS.  Originally a record-oriented filesystem, VSAM comprises four data set organizations: key-sequenced (KSDS), relative record (RRDS), entry-sequenced (ESDS) and linear (LDS). The KSDS, RRDS and ESDS organizations contain records, while the LDS organization (added later to VSAM) simply contains a sequence of pages with no intrinsic record structure, for use as a memory-mapped file.

Overview
An IBM Redbook named "VSAM PRIMER" (especially when used with the "Virtual Storage Access Method (VSAM) Options for Advanced Applications" manual) explains the concepts needed to make use of VSAM. IBM uses the term data set in official documentation as a synonym of file, and direct access storage device (DASD) because it supported other devices similar to disk drives.

VSAM records can be of fixed or variable length.  They are organised in fixed-size blocks called Control Intervals (CIs), and then into larger divisions called Control Areas (CAs).  Control Interval sizes are measured in bytes for example 4 kilobytes while Control Area sizes are measured in disk tracks or cylinders. Control Intervals are the units of transfer between disk and computer so a read request will read one complete Control Interval. Control Areas are the units of allocation so, when a VSAM data set is defined, an integral number of Control Areas will be allocated.

The Access Method Services utility program IDCAMS is commonly used to manipulate ("delete and define") VSAM data sets. Custom programs can access VSAM datasets through Data Definition (DD) statements in Job Control Language (JCL), via dynamic allocation or in online regions such as in Customer Information Control System (CICS).

Both IMS/DB and Db2 are implemented on top of VSAM and use its underlying data structures.

VSAM files
The physical organization of VSAM data sets differs considerably from the organizations used by other access methods, as follows.

A VSAM file is defined as a cluster of VSAM components, e.g., for KSDS a DATA component and an INDEX component.

Control Intervals and Control Areas
VSAM components consist of fixed length physical blocks grouped into fixed length control intervals (CI) and control areas (CA). The size of the CI and CA is determined by the Access Method Services (AMS), and the way in which they are used is normally not visible to the user. There will be a fixed number of control intervals in each control area.

A control interval normally contains multiple records. The records are stored within the control interval starting from the low address upwards. Control information is stored at the other end of the control interval, starting from the high address and moving downwards. The space between the records and the control information is free space. The control information comprises two types of entry: a control interval descriptor field (CIDF) which is always present, and record descriptor fields (RDF) which are present when there are records within the control interval and describe the length of the associated record. Free space within a CI is always contiguous.

When records are inserted into a control interval, they are placed in the correct order relative to other records. This may require records to be moved out of the way inside the control interval. Conversely, when a record is deleted, later records are moved down so that the free space remains contiguous. If there is not enough free space in a control interval for a record to be inserted, the control interval is split. Roughly half the records are stored in the original control interval while the remaining records are moved into a new control interval. The new control interval is taken from a pool of free control intervals within the same control area as the original control interval. If there is no remaining free control interval within that control area, the control area itself is split and the control intervals are distributed equally between the old and the new control areas.

You can use three types of record-orientated file organization with VSAM (the contents of linear data sets have no record structure):

Sequential VSAM organization

An ESDS may have an index defined to it to enable access via keys, by defining an Alternate Index. Records in ESDS are stored in order in which they are written by address access. Records are loaded irrespective of their contents and their byte addresses cannot be changed.

Indexed VSAM organization

A KSDS has two parts: the index component and the data component. These may be stored on separate disk volumes.

While a basic KSDS only has one key (the primary key), alternate indices may be defined to permit the use of additional fields as secondary keys. An Alternate Index (AIX) is itself a KSDS.

The data structure used by a KSDS is nowadays known as a B+ tree.

Relative VSAM organization

An RRDS may have an index defined to it to enable access via keys, by defining an Alternate Index.

Linear VSAM organization 

An LDS is an unstructured VSAM dataset with a control interval size of a multiple of 4K. It is used by certain system services.

VSAM Data Access Techniques 
There are four types of access techniques for VSAM data:

 Local Shared Resources (LSR), is optimised for "random" or direct access. LSR access is easy to achieve from CICS.
 Global Shared Resources (GSR)
 Non-Shared Resources (NSR), which is optimised for sequential access. NSR access has historically been easier to use than LSR for batch programs.
 Distributed File Management (DFM), an implementation of a Distributed Data Management Architecture server, enables programs on remote computers to create, manage, and access VSAM files.

Sharing VSAM data
Sharing of VSAM data between CICS regions can be done by VSAM Record-Level Sharing (RLS). This adds record caching and, more importantly, record locking. Logging and commit processing remain the responsibility of CICS which means that sharing of VSAM data outside a CICS environment is severely restricted.

Sharing between CICS regions and batch jobs requires Transactional VSAM, DFSMStvs. This is an optional program that builds on VSAM RLS by adding logging and two-phase commit, using underlying z/OS system services. This permits generalised sharing of VSAM data.

History
VSAM was introduced as a replacement for older access methods and was intended to add function, to be easier to use and to overcome problems of performance and device-dependence. VSAM was introduced in the 1970s when IBM announced virtual storage operating systems (DOS/VS, OS/VS1 and OS/VS2) for its new System/370 series, as successors of the DOS/360 and OS/360 operating systems running on its System/360 computer series. While backwards compatibility was maintained, the older access methods suffered from performance problems due to the address translation required for virtual storage.

The KSDS organization was designed to replace ISAM, the Indexed Sequential Access Method. Changes in disk technology had meant that searching for data in ISAM data sets had become very inefficient. It was also difficult to move ISAM data sets as there were embedded pointers to physical disk locations which became invalid if the data set was moved. IBM also provided a compatibility interface to allow programs coded to use ISAM to use a KSDS instead.

The RRDS organization was designed to replace BDAM, the Basic Direct Access Method. In some cases, BDAM data sets contained embedded pointers which prevented them from being moved. However, most BDAM data sets did not and the incentive to move from BDAM to VSAM RRDS was much less compelling than that to move from ISAM to VSAM KSDS.

Linear data sets were added later, followed by VSAM RLS and then Transactional VSAM.

See also 
 Job Control Language (JCL)
 IBM mainframe utility programs
 ISAM
 Geneva ERS
 Record Management Services, a similar system developed by Digital Equipment Corporation

Notes

References 

 VSAM Demystified
 DFSMStvs Overview and Planning Guide

IBM mainframe operating systems
IBM file systems
Computer file formats